Cockerill is a surname. Notable people with the surname include:

Sport and sportsmen
Callum Cockerill-Mollett, English footballer
Glenn Cockerill, English football manager
Harry Cockerill (footballer) (1894–1960), English footballer
John Cockerill (footballer), British football player
Kay Cockerill, American golfer
Mike Cockerill, Australian football journalist
Richard Cockerill, English rugby player
Ricky Cockerill, New Zealander figure skater
Ron Cockerill, English football player
Samuel Cockerill, English cricketer

Other people
Harry Cockerill (1899–1987), Australian politician
John Cockerill (industrialist), British businessman and founder of John Cockerill & Cie. (later SA John Cockerill), son of William
Joseph R. Cockerill, U.S. Representative
 George K. Cockerill (1867–1957), British Army officer and Conservative Member of Parliament for Reigate 1918–1931
 George Cockerill (journalist) (1871–1943), Australian journalist and write
 William Cockerill, British entrepreneur of the Industrial Revolution

See also
A number of related Belgian steel companies: (chronologically):
John Cockerill (company, 1825–1955), Cockerill-Ougrée (1955), Cockerill-Ougrée-Providence (1966), Cockerill-Ougrée-Providence et Espérance Longdoz (1970), Cockerill (1979) or Cockerill-Sambre (1981).
also Cockerill Maintenance & Ingénierie, Belgian mechanical engineering company

See also
Cockerell

English-language surnames